Converts is a novel by Ian Watson published in 1984.

Plot summary
Converts is a novel in which characters are artificially evolved into superhumans.

Reception
Dave Langford reviewed Converts for White Dwarf #58, and stated that "You keep alternating between smiles and groans as you read..."

Reviews
Review by Debbie Notkin (1984) in Locus, #283 August 1984
Review by Martyn Taylor (1985) in Vector 124/125
Review by Darrell Schweitzer (1986) in Thrust, #24, Summer 1986

References

1984 British novels
British science fiction novels
Panther Books books